Diachea is a genus of slime molds belonging to the family Didymiaceae. The genus was first described in 1825 by Elias Magnus Fries.

The genus has a cosmopolitan distribution.

Species 
The genus includes the following species:

 Diachea bulbillosa
 Diachea leucopodia (Bull.) Rostaf. 1874
 Diachea splendens
 Diachea subsessilis
 Diachea thomasii
 Diachea verrucospora Nann.-Bremek. & Y.Yamam.

References

External links 

 Diachea occurrence data from GBIF

Myxogastria
Amoebozoa genera